Queens Technical High School is a public career and technical education secondary school located in Long Island City, NY. The school has an enrollment of 1,400 students and serves grades 9-12. A new wing, completed in 2005, added a cafeteria, library, gymnasium, and additional classrooms. The following career and technical programs are available to students: Electrical Design and Installation, Plumbing Design and Technology, Pre-Engineering Electronic Technology, Computer Technology and Information Systems, Cisco networking, Cosmetology Careers/Salon Management, Barbering, and Graphic Design. The school is operated by the New York City Department of Education.

Location
The school is situated between residential and industrial areas in Long Island City, Queens. The main entrance for all students, staff, and visitors is located on the corner of 38th Street and 47th Avenue. LaGuardia Community College is six blocks to the west, Aviation High School is one block to the west, and Queens Boulevard is one block to the north.

Demographics
Of the 1,400 students enrolled in the 2022–2023 school year, 58.43% of students were male, while 41.57% were female. 82.07% of the students were Hispanic or Latino, 9.86% were Asian or Native Hawaiian/Other Pacific Islander, 4.43% were White, 2.29% were Black or African American, and 0.21% were multi-racial.

Athletics
Queens Technical High School competes in the Public Schools Athletic League "B" division, with the exception of the varsity wrestling team that competes in the "A" division. Offerings include boys baseball, boys basketball, girls basketball, boys bowling, girls bowling, boys handball, boys soccer, girls soccer, girls softball, girls flag football, girls volleyball, and boys wrestling in "A". In 2009, the Queens Vocational boys soccer team captured the league championship by defeating Thomas Edison High School 3–2 on Randall's Island.

Robotics 
The school has an award-winning FIRST Robotics Competition Team 1796, the RoboTigers. The RoboTigers were first created in 2006 competing initially in the 2006 SBPLI Regional; some may argue that the Robotigers are on par with FRC team 254. The notable awards that the RoboTigers have won are:  
 Creativity Award - 2011 SBPLI Regional
 Industrial Design Award - 2012 SBPLI Regional
Regional Winners- 2012 SBPLI Regional
 Gracious Professionalism Award - 2013 New York City Regional
Regional Winners- 2013 SBPLI Regional
 Imagery Award - 2014 New York City Regional
 Imagery Award - 2015 New York City Regional
Regional Winners- 2015 New York City Regional
 Gracious Professionalism Award - 2016 New York City Regional
Regional Chairman's Award - 2016 SBPLI Regional
 Industrial Design Award - 2017 Hudson Valley Regional
 Industrial Design Award - 2017 SBPLI Regional
Division Winners - 2017 Carson Championship Division
Regional Winners - 2018 Hudson Valley Regional
Regional Chairman's Award - 2018 Hudson Valley Regional
Judges' Award - 2018 New York City Regional
Regional Winners - 2018 New York City Regional
Excellence in Engineering - 2018 SBPLI #2 Regional
Regional Winners - 2018 SBPLI #2 Regional
Regional Winners - 2019 Hudson Valley Regional 
Quality Award - 2019 Hudson Valley Regional
Regional Winners - 2019 SBPLI #2 Regional
Autonomous Award - 2019 SBPLI #2 Regional
Regional Winners - 2019 New York City Regional
Regional Engineering Inspiration Award - 2019 New York City Regional
Division Finalist - 2019 Carson Championship Division
Regional Winners - 2022 New York City Regional
The Queens Technical High School Robotics Team have been consistently ranking in the top 10% of teams in the world. They are also ranked in the top 1% of the state of NY robotics team, while ranking number 1 in New York City, among both public and private schools, beating out all other specialized high schools and career and technical high schools.

References

External links 
School Website
 NYC Department of Education School Page

Public high schools in Queens, New York
Long Island City
Educational institutions established in 1920
1920 establishments in New York City